Kate Cloonen (born July 9, 1954) was a Democratic member of the Illinois House of Representatives, representing the 79th District from 2013 to 2017.  The 79th district includes all or parts of Kankakee, Bourbonnais, Bradley, Essex, Hopkins Park, Peotone, Herscher and Braceville.

References

External links
Representative Katherine Cloonen (D), 79th District at the Illinois General Assembly
 
Rep. Kate Cloonen at Illinois House Democrats

1954 births
Living people
People from Kankakee, Illinois
Ball State University alumni
National Louis University alumni
Businesspeople from Illinois
Educators from Illinois
American women educators
Women state legislators in Illinois
Democratic Party members of the Illinois House of Representatives
21st-century American politicians
21st-century American women politicians